Aydinlu (also Romanized as Āydīnlū) is a village in Dikleh Rural District, Hurand District, Ahar County, East Azerbaijan Province, Iran. At the 2006 census, its population was 202, in 40 families.

References 

Populated places in Ahar County